Fire from the Sky is the seventh and most recent studio album by American heavy metal band Shadows Fall. The album was released on May 15, 2012. The band released the title track as the first single on March 28, 2012, and the opening track, "The Unknown", as the second single on May 2, as well as a lyric video for the song. About a week later, on May 10, the official music video for "The Unknown" was released through Vevo. The video features the band playing in an abandoned warehouse. The album debuted at position no. 38 on the Billboard 200. It also debuted at number 85 in Canada.

Lyrical themes
Themes explored in Fire from the Sky include the apocalypse, chaos, doomsday, and the supposed events that may occur at the end of 2012, the end of the Mayan calendar. Brian Fair made the following comment:

Song meanings

The song "The Unknown" is about "the temptation to give into depression instead of fighting it," and is written from the viewpoint of someone who ultimately succumbed to the pressure. "Divide and Conquer" talks about division between people, whether in politics or among friends, and how this division makes it harder to sustain things and come together as one. The only resolution is to work together towards a better future. "Weight of the World" deals with doomsday and the end of the world approaching. It also deals with the rapid growth of technology and concerns of technological singularity.

"Nothing Remains," a '70s rock influenced tune, is about the heroes we have lost that we looked up to. "Fire from the Sky," reminiscent of early '90s death metal such as Morbid Angel, tells the story of a star going supernova and devouring planets. "Save Your Soul" deals with hanging onto unresolved problems. Becoming stuck in the past can eat away at someone, and "letting go" is often easier said than done.

"Blind Faith" is a political song, and addresses "society giving up too much control to the ruling elite", and blindly following in the vein of paternalism. The track "Lost Within" is about being inspired by a person or movement, and then later realizing this idealism is false. In other words, some role models become internalized and selfish, and sell out or develop materialistic motives. "Walk the Edge" is largely influenced by '80s glam metal, and contains a few riffs originally from the Retribution sessions. The song is about opiate addiction and the thin line between control and overdose. For "The Wasteland," Fair was inspired by one of his favorite poems, The Waste Land by T. S. Eliot. He also drew influence from the Book of Revelation to create an apocalyptic theme.

Track listing

Personnel

Shadows Fall
Brian Fair – lead vocals
Jon Donais – lead guitar, backing vocals
Matt Bachand – rhythm guitar, clean vocals
Paul Romanko – bass
Jason Bittner – drums

Production
Produced and engineered by Adam Dutkiewicz
Assistant engineering by Jim Fogarty 
Mixed by Brian Virtue at Modernist Movement Studios
Mastered by Paul Logus at Taloowa
Album artwork and design by Aaron Marsh

References

External links
 Official website

2012 albums
Shadows Fall albums
Razor & Tie albums
Albums produced by Adam Dutkiewicz